Hiraizumi – Temples, Gardens and Archaeological Sites Representing the Buddhist Pure Land is a grouping of five sites from late eleventh- and twelfth-century Hiraizumi, Iwate Prefecture, Japan. The serial nomination was inscribed on the UNESCO World Heritage List in 2011, under criteria ii and vi.

Hiraizumi
For four generations from c.1087, when Fujiwara no Kiyohira moved his headquarters and residence from further north, until 1189, when the army of Minamoto no Yoritomo put an end to the Northern Fujiwara, Hiraizumi served as an important political, military, commercial, and cultural centre. Several major temples associated with Pure Land Buddhism were founded and endowed, but the demise of their benefactors and a series of fires contributed to their subsequent decline. When Bashō visited in 1689 he was moved to write, in Oku no Hosomichi: summer grass... remains of soldiers' dreams. A series of excavations from the mid-twentieth century onwards combined with references in Azuma Kagami, in particular the Bunji-no-chūmon petition of 1189, and the Shōwa sojō or "monks' appeal" of 1313 from the Chūson-ji archives, has contributed much to the understanding of the sites and the period.

Component sites

Original submission
The original 2006 nomination of "Hiraizumi - Cultural Landscape Associated with Pure Land Buddhist Cosmology" included five further sites while omitting that of Kanjizaiō-in as a separate component. Four were removed from the nomination after the failure to secure inscription in 2008; the component site of the Yanagi Palace was excluded from the 2011 inscription, although there are continuing efforts to secure its inclusion through future extension.

Gallery

See also

 List of National Treasures of Japan (temples)
 List of Historic Sites of Japan (Iwate)
 List of Special Places of Scenic Beauty, Special Historic Sites and Special Natural Monuments
 Pure Land Buddhism
 Japanese gardens
 World Heritage Sites in Japan

References

Further reading

External links
 UNESCO entry
 Hiraizumi - World Heritage (Hiraizumi Town)
 Chūson-ji homepage
 Mōtsū-ji homepage
  Hiraizumi - World Heritage (Iwate Prefecture)

Japanese culture
Buildings and structures in Iwate Prefecture
World Heritage Sites in Japan
Culture in Iwate Prefecture
Tourist attractions in Iwate Prefecture
Buddhism in the Heian period